5 Force Support Battalion REME is a battalion of the Royal Electrical and Mechanical Engineers of the British Army.

History
The battalion was formed in the early 2000's, at Catterick Garrison, from the grouping of a number of separate companies. The battalion deployed on Operation Telic II, in 2003, to support 19th Mechanised Brigade.

Future Soldier 
Under the Future Soldier reforms, the battalion is due to re-subordinate to 101 Operational Sustainment Brigade.

Structure
The battalion's current structure is as follows:
1 Field Company
2 Field Company
15 Field Company

References

Battalions of the Royal Electrical and Mechanical Engineers